Elk Falls Township is a township in Elk County, Kansas, United States.  As of the 2000 census, its population was 196.

Geography
According to the USGS, it contains one cemetery, Mount Olivet.

The streams of South Fork Wildcat Creek and Wildcat Creek run through this township.

Transportation
Elk Falls Township contains one airport or landing strip, Elk County Airport.

References
 USGS Geographic Names Information System (GNIS)

External links
 US-Counties.com
 City-Data.com

Townships in Elk County, Kansas
Townships in Kansas